David Norman Verry (September 18, 1922 – October 12, 1961) was an American football player and coach. He was a member of the Chicago Rockets of the All-America Football Conference (AAFC).

References

1922 births
1961 deaths
American football tackles
Chicago Rockets players
USC Trojans football coaches
USC Trojans football players
People from Hanford, California
Sportspeople from Visalia, California
Players of American football from California